Banksia calophylla is a species of shrub that is endemic to Western Australia. It has a fire-tolerant, underground stem, pinnatifid leaves that have woolly hairs on the lower surface and heads of thirty to forty-five yellowish brown flowers surrounded by hairy bracts.

Description
Banksia calophylla is a shrub with a fire-tolerant underground stem and pinnatifid leaves that are woolly hairy on their lower surface.

Taxonomy and naming
This species was first formally described in 1830 by Robert Brown who gave it the name Dryandra calophylla and published the description in the supplement to his Prodromus Florae Novae Hollandiae et Insulae Van Diemen. The specific epithet (calophylla) is derived from ancient Greek words meaning "beautiful" and "leaf". In 2007 Austin Mast and Kevin Thiele transferred all dryandras to the genus Banksia.

Distribution and habitat
This banksia grows in shrubland and woodland between Tenterden, Albany and Wellstead in the Esperance Plains and Jarrah Forest biogeographic regions.

References

 

calophylla
Plants described in 1830
Endemic flora of Western Australia
Eudicots of Western Australia
Taxa named by Kevin Thiele